JSK Selver/Tähe Jõgeva is an Estonian floorball league team based in Jõgeva, Estonia. The club has won Estonian Championship for 9 times and finished second for 7 times. Players of the club represent also Estonian National team. The club has also participated in the Latvian Floorball League. Former SK Tähe player Rein Kivi, plays for Finnish club Helsingi SSV.

History
JSK Tähe was founded on 12 October 1995. For today, the club is famous in Estonia and in other countries. Thanks to club success over the country, SK Tähe membership has grown every year. For this season, the club has over 120 players of different ages. The club has a first team, which is taking part in Estonian premiership and Latvian floorball championships. The club has performed in the first league of Estonian Championship. JSK Tähe had a women's floorball team too and they were successful in the championship, but for now the women's team has fallen apart. The club has also training for younger boys and girls. 
Marko Saksing is the founder of the club and playing coach.

Squad

Goaltenders
1   Tõnis Vähi
20  Rainer Kalde
92  Gerno Rebane

Defencemen
14  Lauri Hõim
16  Hannes Pagi (A)
22  Siim Selgis
24  Sander Kinks
27  Nikita Bõstrov (C)
32  Tanel Soidla
33  Toomas Peterson
38  Jüri Narits
88  Tammi Kivi

Forwards
 2  Sven Uue
3  Kaspar Virkus
5  Sten Veskis
8  Nikolai Roop
10  Raul Kivi
11  Marko Saksing
12  Raido Moor
13  Siim Hõim
15  Kalmer Koossalu
19  Mario Paulus
21  Alari Pagi
23  Kaido Ingver
28  Ilmar Niitov
40  Rauno Vadi
52  Vaiko Vadi
58  Valery Maslov (A)
69  Margus Guss
71  Vladimir Nurmi
79  Pavel Semenov
87  Siim Sommer

References

External links
 

Floorball in Latvia
Floorball in Estonia